El Cantante (English: The Singer) is the soundtrack album to the film of the same name, the seventh Spanish-language and the ninth studio album by American singer Marc Anthony.

Background
Marc Anthony plays the role of Héctor Lavoe in El Cantante, a film he had been wanting and waiting to make for many years. Lavoe was known, and is still considered a hero to salsa fans, famed for the artistry of his vocals and the intensity of his rhythm, as well as his involvement with famous salsa musician Willie Colón during the early '70s were high points for salsa, and they paved the way for many vocalists to come (including one Marc Anthony). The album is not only a soundtrack, but a tribute album to the famous salsa singer. Anthony's cover versions of "Aguanile", "Che Che Colé", "Mi Gente" and "El Cantante", have become chart topping hits on the United States Latin Billboard. Anthony also worked with Rubén Blades during the production of the film, as well as the soundtrack. The tenth track finds Jennifer Lopez, Anthony's wife in the film, performing a pop ballad titled "Toma de Mí," composed by Canadian singer-songwriter Nelly Furtado. The album was awarded Best Salsa Album at the Latin Grammy Awards of 2008 and Tropical Album of the Year at the 2008 Latin Billboard Music Awards.

Commercial performance
The soundtrack debuted at number 1 on the Billboard Top Latin Albums chart and number 31 on the Billboard 200. In its second week it still peaked at number 1 on the Top Latin Albums but felt back 2 places to end at number 33 on the Billboard 200. It still peaked the Top Latin Albums in the third, fourth and fifth week and went on number 32, number 44 and number 55 on the Billboard 200.

Track listing
 "El Cantante" (Rubén Blades) – 6:47
 "Mi Gente" (Johnny Pacheco) – 3:52
 "Escándalo" (Rafael Cárdenas Crespo; Rubén Fuentes) – 3:58
 "Aguanilé" (Willie Colón; Héctor Lavoe) – 5:15
 "Che Che Colé" (Willie Colón) – 3:26
 "El Día de Mi Suerte" (Willie Colón; Héctor Lavoe) – 5:19
 "Qué Lío" (Willie Colón; Joe Cuba; Héctor Lavoe) – 4:24
 "Quítate Tú" (Johnny Pacheco; Bobby Valentín) – 4:24
 "Todo Tiene Su Final" (Willie Colón) – 4:56
 "Toma de Mí" (Performed by Jennifer Lopez) (Nelly Furtado; Julio Reyes Copello) — 4:2

Personnel

Performers

Yomo Toro – Cuatro
Milton Cardona – Vocals, coro
Tito Allen – Vocals, Coro
Bobby Allende – Conga
Renaldo Jorge – Trombone
Myung Hi Kim – Violin
Ozzie Melendez – Trombone
Suzanne Ornstein – Violin
Ricardo Tiki Pasillas – Percussion
Marc Quiñones – Timbales
Laura Seaton – Violin
Gene Moye – Cello
Sergio George – Piano
Ray Colon – Bongos, bells
Raul Agraz – Trumpet
Luis Quintero – Percussion, timbales 
William Castro – Arpa
William Duval – Vocals
Sarah Seiver – Cello
José Tabares – Bass
Peter Winograd – Violin
Ramon B. Sanchez – Conductor
Robert Rinehart – Viola
Daniel Panner – Viola
Elizabeth Dyson – Cello
Jenny Strenger – Violin
Wilson Cifuentes – Flute, gaita
Katherine Fong – Violin
Duoming Ba – Violin
Minyoung Chang – Violin
Sarah OBoyle – Violin
Wen Qian – Violin
Sein Ryu – Violin
Mario Guini – Electric guitar
Julio Reyes Copello – Piano
Jose Mangual – Vocals, Coro
Daniel Caro – Bandola
Oriol Caro – Tiple
Angélica Gámez – Violin 
Laura Ospina – Cello 
Urian Sarmiento – Percussion

Technical

Marc Anthony – Producer, executive producer 
Sergio George – Producer 
Héctor Ivan Rosa – Engineer 
Jim Caruana – Engineer 
Luisito Quintero – Percussion overdubs 
David Kutch – Mastering 
Vlado Meller – Mastering
Peter Wade Keusch – Engineer 
Bigram Zayas – Producer 
Alysia Oakley – Assistant music supervisor 
Maria Paula Marulanda – Art direction 
Matt Havron – Assistant Music supervisor 
Julio Reyes Copello – Arranger, programming, producer

Charts

Weekly charts

Year-end charts

See also
List of number-one Billboard Top Latin Albums of 2007
List of number-one Billboard Tropical Albums from the 2000s

References

External links
 Official El Cantante home page

Biographical film soundtracks
Marc Anthony soundtracks
2007 soundtrack albums
Sony BMG Norte soundtracks
Latin Grammy Award for Best Salsa Album
Albums produced by Sergio George
Spanish-language soundtracks
Tribute albums